Seetha Raman (Sita Raman) is a 2023 Indian Tamil language television series premiered on Zee Tamil and streaming on the digital platform ZEE5. It is launched on 20 February 2023 with the star cast Priyanka Nalkari and Jay D'Souza are in the titular roles with Reshma Pasupuleti.

Plot
The story about around Seetha (Priyanka Nalkari), who gets married off to a man called Ram (Jay Dsouza),  who was previously in love with her elder sister Mathumitha but Mathumitha runs away as she is in love with Suriya. Seetha has faced rejection largely from society and Raman's Family simply because of her looks. The story tell how to Seetha is determined to win over her husband despite all odds.

Cast

Main
 Priyanka Nalkari as Seetha
 Jay D'Souza as Ram
 Reshma Pasupuleti as Mahalakshmi

Recurring 
 Akshitha Bopaiah as Madhumitha
 R. Shyam as Surya
 Saakshi Siva as Rajasekar
 Vinodhini as Uma Maheswari
 Meena Sellamuthu as Poornima 
 Rani/Rekha Krishnappa as Archana
 Prakash Rajan as Subash
 Prabhakaran as Sethupathy
 Hari Krishnan as Durai
 Nancy as Anjali
 Sreepriya as Sathya
 Aiswarya Rajesh as Priya
 Yadhavi as Meera

Cameo appearance
 Padine Kumar (Episode: 1)
 Niyaz (Episode: 1)

Production

Casting
Roja fame Priyanka Nalkari was cast in the female lead role as Seetha. Jay Dsouza plays the male lead alongside her. Actress Rani and Reshma Pasupuleti as selected to play the Importen role. Saakshi Siva and Vinodhini plays a father and mother role of Seetha and Mathumitha.

Release
The first promo was unveiled on 31 January 2023, featuring protagonist Priyanka Nalkari and revealing the Title name. The second promo was unveiled on 3 February 2023, featuring protagonist Priyanka Nalkari, Jay Dsouza, Reshma Pasupuleti and Akshitha Bopaiah and revealing the 2 Minutes story song.

The show started airing on Zee Tamil on 20 February 2023 From Monday to Saturday at 19:30 (IST), replacing Ninaithale Inikkum Time slot.

References

Zee Tamil original programming
2023 Tamil-language television series debuts
Tamil-language television shows
Television shows set in Tamil Nadu
Tamil-language romance television series
Tamil-language melodrama television series
Tamil-language television series based on Bengali-languages television series